Affine shape adaptation is a methodology for iteratively adapting the shape of the smoothing kernels in an affine group of smoothing kernels to the local image structure in neighbourhood region of a specific image point. Equivalently, affine shape adaptation can be accomplished by iteratively warping a local image patch with affine transformations while applying a rotationally symmetric filter to the warped image patches. Provided that this iterative process converges, the resulting fixed point will be affine invariant. In the area of computer vision, this idea has been used for defining affine invariant interest point operators as well as affine invariant texture analysis methods.

Affine-adapted interest point operators 

The interest points obtained from the scale-adapted Laplacian blob detector or the multi-scale Harris corner detector with automatic scale selection are invariant to translations, rotations and uniform rescalings in the spatial domain. The images that constitute the input to a computer vision system are, however, also subject to perspective distortions. To obtain interest points that are more robust to perspective transformations, a natural approach is to devise a feature detector that is invariant to affine transformations.

Affine invariance can be accomplished from measurements of the same multi-scale windowed second moment matrix  as is used in the multi-scale Harris operator provided that we extend the regular scale space concept obtained by convolution with rotationally symmetric Gaussian kernels to an affine Gaussian scale-space obtained by shape-adapted Gaussian kernels. For a two-dimensional image , let  and let  be a positive definite 2×2 matrix. Then, a non-uniform Gaussian kernel can be defined as

and given any input image  the affine Gaussian scale-space is the three-parameter scale-space defined as

Next, introduce an affine transformation  where  is a 2×2-matrix, and define a transformed image  as
.

.
Disregarding mathematical details, which unfortunately become somewhat technical if one aims at a precise description of what is going on, the important message is that the affine Gaussian scale-space is closed under affine transformations.

If we, given the notation  as well as local shape matrix  and an integration shape matrix , introduce an affine-adapted multi-scale second-moment matrix according to

it can be shown that under any affine transformation  the affine-adapted multi-scale second-moment matrix transforms according to
.

An important consequence of this study is that if we can find an affine transformation  such that  is a constant times the unit matrix, then we obtain a fixed-point that is invariant to affine transformations. For the purpose of practical implementation, this property can often be reached by in either of two main ways. The first approach is based on transformations of the smoothing filters and consists of:

 estimating the second-moment matrix  in the image domain,
 smoothing the original image by the shape-adapted smoothing kernel, and
 repeating this operation until the difference between two successive second-moment matrices is sufficiently small.

The second approach is based on warpings in the image domain and implies:
 estimating  in the image domain,
 warping the input image by the affine transformation  and
 repeating this operation until   is sufficiently close to a constant times the unit matrix.

This overall process is referred to as affine shape adaptation. In the ideal continuous case, the two approaches are mathematically equivalent. In practical implementations, however, the first filter-based approach is usually more accurate in the presence of noise while the second warping-based approach is usually faster.

In practice, the affine shape adaptation process described here is often combined with interest point detection automatic scale selection as described in the articles on blob detection and corner detection, to obtain interest points that are invariant to the full affine group, including scale changes. Besides the commonly used multi-scale Harris operator, this affine shape adaptation can also be applied to other types of interest point operators such as the Laplacian/Difference of Gaussian blob operator and the determinant of the Hessian . Affine shape adaptation can also be used for affine invariant texture recognition and affine invariant texture segmentation.

Closely related to the notion of affine shape adaptation is the notion of affine normalization, which defines an affine invariant reference frame'' as further described in Lindeberg (:Appendix I.3), such that any image measurement performed in the affine invariant reference frame is affine invariant.

See also 
Blob detection
Corner detection
Gaussian function
Harris affine region detector
Hessian affine region detector
Scale space

References

 
 
 
 
 
 
 
 
 
 

Feature detection (computer vision)